Alternative Investment Strategies Limited was a large British investment fund dedicated to investing in hedge funds. Established in December 1996, the company was listed on the London Stock Exchange. The Chairman was Nicholas Wilson. It returned all its assets to investors and closed down in February 2014.

References

External links
 Official site

Investment trusts of the United Kingdom